Zahkring (also Eastern Mishmi or Zaiwa; known as Meyor in India and Zha (Zhahua 扎话) in China) is a language of Arunachal Pradesh and 3 villages in Tibet.

Classification
Zakhring has been classified as a Midzuish language. Blench and Post (2011) consider Zakhring to be an East Bodish language that has been influenced by Midzu (which they classify as a language isolate) or other divergent languages of the region. In 2015, Blench suggests that Zakhring may be a language isolate. Blench argues that Zakhring had borrowed heavily from Midzu and Tibetic, and then later borrowed from Naga languages and Jingpho as well.

Scott DeLancey (2015) considers Meyor to be part of a wider Central Tibeto-Burman group.

Names
Li and Jiang (2001) reports that the Zakhring have no actual autonym, but are referred to by the neighboring Taraon, Kaman language, Idu, and Tibetan peoples by various names.

 (Taraon exonym)
 (Kaman exonym)
 (Tibetan exonym)
 (Idu exonym; the Idu are located in Upper Zayü Township, 上察隅乡)

Distribution
In China, Zakhring is spoken in Songgu (松古村), Lading (拉丁村), and Tama (塔玛村) villages in Lower Zayü Township (下察隅乡), Zayü County (察隅县), Tibet.

In India, Meyor communities are found in the following 15 villages of Kibthoo Circle and Walong Circle of Anjaw District, Arunachal Pradesh.  The total population of the villages numbered 376 as of May 2001.
Kibthoo Circle
Kahao
Mosai
Danbari
Kundan
Khroti
Yaikung
Bara Kundan 
8Kunjuk
Walong Circle
Walong
Tinai
Dong
Tilam
Sapkung
Pangung

See also
Zakhring word list (Wiktionary)

References

 

Miju languages
Mishmi languages
Languages of India